Sir Joseph Renals, 1st Baronet (21 February 1843 – 1 November 1908) was Lord Mayor of London for 1894–95.

Career
The son of William Renals, of The Park, Nottingham, Renals was born in Nottingham and was privately educated there. He was a partner in the firm of Renals & Co, merchants.

He was Common Councillor for Aldersgate Ward between 1885 and 1888, and an Alderman from 1888 to 1907. He was Sheriff of the City of London for 1892–93 and Lord Mayor of London for 1894–95. His tenure as Lord Mayor was controversial, and the City of London Corporation refused to pass the customary vote of thanks on his relinquishing the office.

He was created a Baronet, of the City of London, on 4 September 1895.

See also 

 Renals baronets

References 

1843 births
1908 deaths
19th-century lord mayors of London
Baronets in the Baronetage of the United Kingdom
British businesspeople
Officiers of the Légion d'honneur
People from Nottingham
Aldermen of the City of London
Councilmen of the City of London
Sheriffs of the City of London